This is intended as a non-exhaustive list of input methods for Unix platforms. An input method is a means of entering characters and glyphs that have a corresponding encoding in a character set. See the input method page for more information.

Input methods
Unix
Computing-related lists